During the 1971–72 English football season, Everton F.C. competed in the Football League First Division. They finished 15th in the table with 36 points.

Final league table

Results

Football League First Division

FA Cup

League Cup

Squad

References

1971–72
Everton F.C. season